Leandersson is a Swedish surname. Notable people with the surname include:

Bengt Leandersson, Swedish ski-orienteering competitor
Jonas Leandersson, Swedish orienteering competitor
Lina Leandersson (born 1995), Swedish actress
Gösta Leandersson (1918–1995), Swedish marathon runner
Tomas Leandersson (1966–2021), Swedish ten-pin bowler
William Leandersson (born 1984), Swedish association football player